Docirava flavilinata is a moth of the family Geometridae. It is found in Taiwan.

References

Moths described in 1878
Chesiadini
Moths of Taiwan